Khalor is a census town in Bagnan I CD Block of Uluberia subdivision in Howrah district in the Indian state of West Bengal.

Demographics
As per 2011 Census of India Khalor had a total population of 9,636 of which 4,864 (50%) were males and 4,772 (50%) were females. Population below 6 years was 749. The total number of literates in Khalor was 8,231 (92.62% of the population over 6 years).

 India census, Khalor had a population of 8669. Males constitute 51% of the population and females 49%. Khalor has an average literacy rate of 83%, higher than the national average of 59.5%: male literacy is 87%, and female literacy is 79%. In Khalor, 8% of the population is under 6 years of age.

References

Cities and towns in Howrah district